The 2018 FIA R-GT Cup was the fourth edition of the FIA rally cup for GT cars in Group R-GT. The cup was contested over 5 tarmac rounds from the WRC, the ERC and the Rallye International du Valais. The competition was won by French driver Raphaël Astier in an Abarth 124 R-GT.

Calendar 
The calendar for the 2018 season features five tarmac rallies: two selected tarmac rounds from the WRC, two selected rounds from the ERC and the 59. Rallye International du Valais from the TER series.

Entries

Results

Standings
Points are awarded to the top ten classified finishers.

Source:

FIA R-GT Cup for Drivers

FIA R-GT Cup for Manufacturers

References 

FIA R-GT Cup
R-GT Cup